The American Library Association's Great Graphic Novels for Teens, established in 2007, is an annual list presented by Young Adult Library Services Association (YALSA) division of graphic novels and illustrated nonfiction geared toward individuals ages 12–18.   

Like YALSA's other lists, librarians, parents, and educators rely on the Great Graphic Novels for Teens list to help select suitable texts for their collections. This is particularly important for graphic novels, which are popular among young adults and have rapidly gained popularity in the past thirty years. Graphic novels are especially popular among "reluctant readers" and "visual learners", and they can "improve comprehension and interpretation of themes, literary devices, and social issues, among other topics."

Criteria 
To be included on the Great Graphic Novels for Teens list, books must have been published "during the sixteen months preceding the award", "appeal to ages twelve to eighteen", and be widely available in the United States. Graphic novels of all types are considered with one limitation: "comic book compilations must contain an overarching story arc."  

In selecting texts for the list, YALSA librarians judge books based on "quality, appeal, and suitability for a teenage audience".

Representations of diversity 
Researchers have analyzed the Great Graphic Novels for Teens list for representations of diversity.

Irwin and Moeller analyzed the 2008 list for representations of individuals with disabilities. Out of 30 graphics novels, 40% included a character with a disability and 13% included two characters with disability, including seven characters with health impairments, three characters with visual impairments, three characters with orthopedic impairments, two characters with emotional disturbances, and one character with a learning disability. Irwin and Moeller found that, according to the Biklen and Bogdan stereotypes, characters were frequently represented as evil and/or "their own worst enemy" and "pitiable"; women with disabilities were more likely to be portrayed as pitiable, whereas only men with disabilities were portrayed as evil. Importantly, 10% of the novels included characters that "were portrayed as inclusive members of their communities".

Reviewing the 2015 list for representations of race, Moeller and Becnel found that 76% of books included characters of color. Further, 5% of the books "were almost entirely of Asian actors".

Mumm's 2017 master's thesis analyzed female characters on the 2016 list and found that female characters were diverse in appearance, had "relatable conversations", and broke away from "stereotypical behaviors", though "some stereotypical conventions remain".

Recipients

2000s

2010s

2020s

Repeat recipients 
Multiple writers have been included on the list more than once. Jeff Lemire, Brian K. Vaughan,  G. Willow Wilson, and Gene Luen Yang, have each been featured on the list four times. Together, John Lewis, Andrew Aydin, and Nate Powell have been listed three times. Svetlana Chmakova has also appeared on the list three times. Lastly, the following writers have each been included on the lust twice: John Allison, Derf Backderf, Brian Michael Bendis, Don Brown, Faith Erin Hicks, Noelle Stevenson, Gengoroh Tagame, Raina Telgemeier, and David F. Walker.

Multiple artists have been included on the list more than once, not including writers who also illustrate their own texts. Adrian Alphona has illustrated three books on the list. Faith Erin Hicks and Francesco Francavilla have each illustrated two books on the list.

References

See also 

2007 establishments in the United States
Awards established in 2007
American Library Association awards